Zionz Lake is a remote lake in Kenora District in northwestern Ontario, Canada.

See also
List of lakes in Ontario

References
 

Lakes of Kenora District